Pilot Mound State Forest is located in Boone County, Iowa, about  southeast of Pilot Mound and  northwest of Boone. The forest sits atop a  glacial mound of the same name.

History

The land that would become Pilot Mound State Forest was donated to the state of Iowa in 1939 by B. P. Holst.  The mound of the same name within the forest was once used as a natural water tower for the city of Pilot Mound.  The land is used for study and research of forest growth.

Access to the Forest

Pilot Mound State Forest lies near the intersection of I Avenue and 140th Street in Boone County.  A narrow access road to the since-removed water tower begins at 140th Street and ends at the top of the mound, which is the second-highest point in the county.  Picnicking, hiking, and hunting are permitted within the boundaries of the forest.

References

Iowa state forests
Protected areas established in 1939
Protected areas of Boone County, Iowa
1939 establishments in Iowa